The BMW Sauber F1.07 is a Formula One single-seater racing car built by BMW Sauber for the 2007 Formula One World Championship. The chassis was designed by Willy Rampf, Walter Reidl, Jörg Zander and Willem Toet with the powertrain being designed by Heinz Paschen. The car was the first to have been designed fully by BMW, following their purchase of the former Sauber team. Initial pre-season testing was very positive, with many speculating that BMW could surprise some of the top teams with their performances when the season got underway.

Aerodynamics
The rear wing is mounted by the endplates, rather than the pylon-mounted arrangement used by some rivals' cars (such as the McLaren MP4-22).

Engine and gearbox
The engine's name, P86/7, is indicative of the fact that it is not a new engine, since it is heavily based on the P86 used in the 2006 F1.06 car. This is a requirement of the homologation rules introduced by the FIA. The BMW Sauber team adopted a seamless shift sequential transmission mechanism, known as QuickShift, for its gearbox.

Livery
BMW Sauber went into the 2007 season with sponsorship continuity; unlike many rival teams, such as McLaren, Honda and Renault, who had to drop their tobacco sponsorship.  This meant the 2007 cars had a similar livery to that of the 2006 design with only subtle changes.

Performance
The car was a significant step up from 's F1.06, scoring 2 podium positions in a season in which 46 of the possible 51 podium positions were occupied by Scuderia Ferrari and McLaren in a dominant season. Both of these were by Nick Heidfeld – a 2nd at the 2007 Canadian Grand Prix and a 3rd at the 2007 Hungarian Grand Prix. However, they scored points on 26 out of a possible 34 occasions. They scored points with at least one car in every single race, and points with both cars six races in a row between the French and Italian Grand Prix. Robert Kubica had 4th places in Spain, France and Britain, which were his best results. Sebastian Vettel scored points for 8th place in his only appearance for the team, at the United States Grand Prix.

Heidfeld was the only driver to frequently break the Ferrari/McLaren deadlock at the front of qualifying, with his best result being 2nd on the grid in Hungary. The BMW Sauber cars qualified in the top 10 in every race apart from Kubica qualifying 14th in Belgium.

The car was also involved in one of the biggest crashes of the modern era, Kubica's at the 2007 Canadian Grand Prix. He was replaced by future world champion Vettel for one race.

Complete Formula One results
(key) (results in bold indicate pole position)

References

External links

 F1.07 technical detail – F1Technical.com

BMW Sauber Formula One cars
Sauber F1.07
2007 Formula One season cars